This Is Your Life  is an album by Philadelphia, Pennsylvania jazz drummer Norman Connors and the Starship Orchestra featuring Eleanor Mills. The album charted at number fifteen on the jazz albums chart.

Track listing
"Stella" - 3:17 Lead Vocals – James Robinson
"This Is Your Life" - 4:13
"Wouldn't You Like To See" - 3:40
"Listen" - 3:51 Lead Vocals – James Robinson
"Say You Love Me" - 4:36
"Captain Connors" - 3:16
"You Make Me Feel Brand New" - 5:45 	
"Butterfly" - 4:58
"The Creator" - 7:58

Personnel
Norman Connors -  Drums, Percussion, Timpani, Lead Vocals
Billy McCoy, Bobby Lyle, Jacques Burvick, Richard Cummings, Richard Tee, Ronnie Coleman - Keyboards
Charles Fearing, David T. Walker, Jay Graydon, Lee Ritenour, Wah Wah Watson - Guitar
James Gadson - Drums
Eddie Watkins, Ben Atkins - Bass
Mike Boddicker - Oberheim Synthesizer
Eddie "Bongo" Brown - Congas
Petro Bass - Percussion
Kenneth Nash - Congas, Bongos, Cymbal (Paiste Cymbals), Gong (Paiste Gongs), Percussion
Gary Bartz - Alto Saxophone, Soprano Saxophone
Pharoah Sanders - Tenor Saxophone
Ralph Buzzy Jones - Soprano Saxophone
Benny Powell, Garnett Brown, George Bohanon, George Thacher, Lew McCreary - Trombone
Charles Moore, Nolan Smith, Jr., Oscar Brashear, Ray Brown, Shunzo Ono - Trumpet
David Ii, Earle Dumler, Ernie Watts, Fred Jackson, Jr., Terry Harrington, Bill Green - Woodwind
James Atkinson, Sidney Muldrow  - French Horn
Marimba, Bells Orchestra, Elmira Collins - Vibraphone
Harry Bluestone - Concertmaster (Strings)
McKinley Jackson - Conductor
Jean Carn, Miss Eleanore Mills, James Robinson - Lead and Backing Vocals

Charts

Singles

References

External links
 Norman Connors-This Is Your Life at Discogs

1977 albums
Norman Connors albums
Arista Records albums